The Zungeni Mountain skirmish took place on 5 June 1879 between British and Zulu forces during the Second invasion of Zululand in what is now part of South Africa.  British irregular horse commanded by Colonel Redvers Buller discovered a force of 300 Zulu levies at a settlement near the Zungeni Mountain.  The horsemen charged and scattered the Zulu before burning the settlement.  Buller's men withdrew after coming under fire from the Zulu who had threatened to surround them.

A force of British cavalry commanded by Major-General Frederick Marshall arrived on the scene and were eager to see action.  A squadron of the 17th (The Duke of Cambridge's Own) Lancers, led by Colonel Drury Drury-Lowe, charged the Zulu.  They cleared the open ground but were not able to press into an area of long grass and bushes from which the Zulu were firing upon the British.  The lancers withdrew after their regimental adjutant, Lieutenant Frederick John Cokayne Frith, was killed by a sniper and the Zulu threatened to outflank them.  The British then withdrew to their camp of the previous night.  Aside from Frith the British casualties included two irregulars wounded; two months after the battle the remains of 25 Zulu were discovered on the battlefield.  After the skirmish the British paused to fortify their camp before proceeding further into Zululand, decisively defeating the Zulu in the 4 July Battle of Ulundi.

Background 
The British, under Lord Chelmsford, invaded Zululand, an kingdom in what is now South Africa, in January 1879 with three mobile columns.  The invasion ended following the defeat of the British Centre Column at the 22 January Battle of Isandlwana.  The British Right Column was besieged by the Zulu at Eshowe while the Left Column remained in the vicinity of Kambula where it engaged local Zulu forces.  Chelmsford requested reinforcements and troops sent out from Britain included a cavalry brigade formed by the 1st King's Dragoon Guards and the 17th (The Duke of Cambridge's Own) Lancers under the command of Major-General Frederick Marshall.

Chelmsford relieved the siege of Eshowe on 3 April and withdrew the Right Column back to the British Colony of Natal.  He reorganised his forces into two main thrusts. The reinforced Right Column was re-designated the First Division and was tasked with a steady advance along the east coast.  The survivors of the Centre Column were reinforced with the cavalry brigade and other fresh troops and became the Second Division that would advance on the Zulu capital Ulundi.  The Left Column, containing a high proportion of colonial irregular horse, which fought as mounted infantry, was re-designated as a flying column under Colonel Evelyn Wood.   Wood's column was to operate in conjunction with the Second Division, supporting its advance on Ulundi.  

By the end of May the Second Division, commanded by Major-General Edward Newdigate, had moved forward from Dundee and was assembled on the banks of the Ncome River at Koppie Alleen, ready to commence the invasion. Chelmsford joined the division on 31 May and commenced the advance into Zululand, simultaneously with Wood further to the north. On 1 June Napoléon, Prince Imperial of France, who had marched with the Second Division, was killed during a skirmish. The Second Division and Wood's flying column met on 3 June at a point on the Nondweni River. They recovered three wagons and an ammunition cart that had been looted from the British at Isandlwana.

Skirmish

Irregular horse 
Early on the morning of 5 June mounted irregulars from Wood's flying column encountered a force of around 300 Zulu at eZulaneni, a collection of four large homesteads between the Zungeni Mountain (which was known to the British as Ezunganyan Hill) and the Ntinini stream.  The horsemen were commanded by Colonel Redvers Buller and included a  squadron of Baker's Horse, a squadron of the Frontier Light Horse, No. 3 Troop  (Bettington's Horse) of the Natal Horse, a troop of the Natal Light Horse and a number of Shepstone's Native Horse, totalling around 300 men.

Buller's men charged, scattering the Zulu, and proceeded to burn the homesteads.  The Zulu counterattacked around the British flanks, in their classic "horns of the buffalo" formation.  The British recognised the risk of being surrounded and withdrew, being fired upon by Zulu skirmishers from cover on their flanks.  Two of Buller's men were wounded in this first phase of the skirmish.

Regular cavalry 
The 2nd Division received intelligence on the evening of 4 June that a sizeable Zulu force had been spotted near to Wood's column.  Marshall was ordered to proceed to Wood's position the following morning, leaving at 4.30 am with around 500 men of his brigade. Passing through Wood's camp Marshall followed the sound of gunfire until found Buller's men retiring from combat. Marshall's men, recently arrived in Africa, were eager to see their first action.  A squadron each from the King's Dragoon Guards and the 17th Lancers were committed to an attack on the Zulu.

Three troops of the 17th Lancers were led forwards by their colonel, Drury Drury-Lowe.  Drury-Lowe ordered some of his men to dismount and return the fire of the Zulu who were sniping from concealment in long grass and bushes.  He led the remainder on a charge in line formation.  The cavalry swept past the Zulu several times but were unable to engage them effectively in close combat owing to the difficult terrain.  

The Zulu held their ground and shot at the passing riders. The Illustrated London News correspondent Melton Prior witnessed Frith's death and noted he was killed whilst riding between Colonel Drury-Lowe and Mr Francis, correspondent of The Times. Private Miles Gissop of the 17th Lancers noted that Frith had been shot immediately after Drury-Lowe had reassured his troops: "you are all right men. You are all right, they [the bullets] are all passing over your heads". Gissop noted that Frith stated "Oh I'm shot" before falling dead from his horse. It was later determined that the bullet that killed Frith had been made in Britain and was fired from a Martini–Henry rifle, both having been captured by the Zulu during earlier engagements.

Frith's death and the movement of the Zulu to outflank the lancers led to the end of the action.  Marshall moved a troop of the King's Dragoon Guards forwards to cover the lancers as they withdrew and Buller's irregulars also provided covering fire.  Gissop noted that after the withdrawal some Zulu emerged from the bushes to count the British dead, though Frith was the only one.

After the skirmish the British participants returned to their own columns and the Nondweni camp, some  back on the route of march.  Frith's body was carried back to the camp where he was buried in a mealie field that evening.  Zulu casualties are not certain but, on 3 August, a British firewood gathering party found the remains of 25 Zulu in the bushes and grass of the battlefield.

Aftermath 
During the day of the action Chelmsford had spoken with three peace envoys from the Zulu king Cetshwayo; these were sent away in the evening with conditions that would be largely unacceptable to Cetshwayo.  The British established the camp as a fortified base, known as Fort Newdigate, to support the advance further into Zululand.  A further raid on Zungeni was mounted on 8 June by a force of lancers, dragoons and two 7-pounder artillery pieces.  This drove off a force of Zulu and burnt many homesteads.

The discovery of a group of Zulu at Zungeni had led to fears that a Zulu army was nearby. This led to the postponement of the court-martial of Lieutenant Jahleel Brenton Carey for failing in his duty as commander during the death of the Prince Imperial.  However intelligence gathered during the skirmish at Zungeni proved that the Zulu were not from the main army but were local levies.  Carey's court-martial proceeded on 12 June and he was found guilty of "misbehaviour before the enemy". 

The 2nd Division and Wood's flying column continued their march into Zululand, patrolling regularly to drive off Zulu forces and establishing several more fortified camps.  The Zulu were finally defeated at the 4 July Battle of Ulundi.  Afterwards some of the horsemen from the force were released from duty and returned to Natal, while others were kept on for the pacification of Zululand.  Prior had made a sketch of the moment of Frith's death during the skirmish and an engraving based on this was published on the front page of the 2 August 1879 edition of the Illustrated London News.

References

Bibliography

Battles of the Anglo-Zulu War
1879 in the Zulu Kingdom
History of KwaZulu-Natal
June 1879 events